The economics of scientific knowledge is an approach to understanding science which is predicated on the need to understand scientific knowledge creation and dissemination in economic terms.

The approach has been developed as a contrast to the sociology of scientific knowledge, which places scientists in their social context and examines their behavior using social theory. The economics of scientific knowledge typically involves thinking of scientists as having economic interests with these being thought of as utility maximisation and science as being a market process. Modelling strategies might use any of a variety of approaches including the neoclassical, game theoretic, behavioural (bounded rationality) information theoretic and transaction costs. Boumans and Davis (2010) mention Dasgupta and David (1994) as being an interesting early example of work in this area.

See also
 Economics of science

References

Science and technology studies
Historiography of science
Science studies
Interdisciplinary subfields of economics